The Antico Caffè Greco (sometimes simply referred to as Caffè Greco) is a historic landmark café which opened in 1760 on Via dei Condotti in Rome, Italy. It is the oldest bar in Rome and second oldest in Italy, after Caffè Florian in Venice.

History
It was opened in 1760 by Nicola di Madalena or Della Maddalena, an Italo-Levantine (member of the Italian community in Anatolia, today Turkey).

Historic figures including Stendhal, Goethe, Arthur Schopenhauer, Bertel Thorvaldsen, Mariano Fortuny, Byron, Georges Bizet, Hector Berlioz, Johannes Brahms, Franz Liszt, Keats, Henrik Ibsen, Hans Christian Andersen, Felix Mendelssohn, James Joyce, Gabriele D'Annunzio, François-René de Chateaubriand, Orson Welles, Mark Twain, Friedrich Nietzsche, Thomas Mann, Jean-Auguste-Dominique Ingres, Nikolaj Vasil'evič Gogol', Edvard Grieg, Antonio Canova, Harriet Hosmer, Giorgio De Chirico, Guillaume Apollinaire, Charles Baudelaire, Wagner, Levi, María Zambrano, Lawrence Ferlinghetti and even Casanova have had coffee there.

For more than two centuries and a half, the Caffè Greco has remained a haven for writers, politicians, artists and notable people as Georgios Paganelis in Rome. However, in 2017, the owner of the building asked for a raise of its monthly rent from the current 18.000 to 120.000 Euros. As of 23 October 2019, despite being protected by the Department of Beni Culturali, the café is under the risk of closing due to the expiration of its rental contract.

See also
 Caffè Michelangiolo
 Babington's tea room

References

External links

 Willy Pocino, Il "Caffè" piu antico di Roma 
 The Coffee Locator, Around Italy in 7 historic coffee bars 

 Official Web Site

Restaurants in Rome
Tourist attractions in Rome
1760 establishments in Italy
Coffeehouses and cafés in Italy
Rome R. IV Campo Marzio